What We Do In Secret is an American Christian hardcore band from Memphis, Tennessee. They have toured with bands such as War of Ages, Phinehas, Silent Planet, Sleepwave, We Came As Romans, '68, For Today and Norma Jean. They have released two EPs.

History
What We Do In Secret was formed in Memphis in March 2012 by Josh Adams, Drew Nance, Devin Harris and Nathan Moody. They recorded their first EP, New Eyes, and released it on August 31, 2013.

Moody left the band after this and was replaced by Clay Crenshaw and Austin Barnes. The band's second EP, The Migration, was released on September 16, 2014, and was produced by Bobby Lynge of Fit for a King. This EP received a 4 Stars review from Scott Swan on the Indie Vision Music website.

After recording The Migration, Barnes left the band in 2014 and was replaced by the guitarist Sean Flowers. Flowers left the band in late 2014. On May 23, 2015, the band released its second music video, "Water It Down". It was covered on HM magazine. The vocalist, Adams, describes the song:

The guitarist, Aaron Kadura, formerly of Fit for a King, joined the band and played his first show with them on July 15, 2015. Kadura was replaced later that year by Luke Kendall. The band is currently recording its first full-length album, due to be released in summer 2016.

On July 26, 2017, it was announced that Drummer Devin Harris would depart from the band. On July 30, 2017, he performed his last show with the band.

On October 4, 2019, the band announced they had signed with Facedown Records and are set to release their debut album, Repose.

Influences
On Facebook, they have stated their influences as Norma Jean, Every Time I Die, Underoath, Stray from the Path, Botch, Feed the Rhino, Converge, Letlive, Glassjaw, Sleeping Giant, Thrice and The Chariot.

Members
Current members
Josh Adams - lead vocals (2012–present)
Clay Crenshaw - guitars, bass (2013–present)
Frank Forbes - drums (2018–present)

Former members
Sean Flowers - rhythm guitar (2014)
Austin Barnes - rhythm guitar, backing vocals (2013-2014)
Nathan Moody - guitars (2012-2013)
Aaron Kadura - rhythm guitar (2015)
Luke Kendall - rhythm guitar, backing vocals (2015–2016)
Drew Nance - bass, backing vocals (2012–2017)
Blake Peel - bass, drums, backing vocals (2017-2018)
Devin Harris - drums (2012–2017)

Touring members
Colten Biggs - lead guitar (2015)

Timeline

Discography
EPs
 New Eyes (August 31, 2013; independent)
 The Migration (August 16, 2014; independent)

Studio albums
 Repose (November 22, 2019; Facedown Records)

Music videos
"No Shelter" (2014)
"Water It Down" (2014)

Compilation appearances
 Metal From The Dragon (Vol. 1) (2016; The Bearded Dragon Productions)

See also
Fit for a King
Christian Metal
Christian hardcore

References

External links
Interview with Clay Crenshaw and Drew Nance

Musical quintets
Musical quartets
Musical groups established in 2012
Musical groups from Memphis, Tennessee
2012 establishments in Tennessee